The Turkish Embassy Letters are a letter collection of Lady Mary Wortley Montagu's reflections on her travels through the Ottoman Empire between 1716 and 1718. She collected and revised them throughout her life, circulating the manuscripts among friends, and they were first published in 1763 after her death.

Background
Mary and Edward Wortley Montagu, both of wealthy and aristocratic families, married in 1712. Mary played an active role in furthering Edward's ambitious political career. In 1716, Edward was appointed as the Ambassador Extraordinary to the Court of Turkey, which he and Mary expected to be a twenty-year position abroad. One of Edward Montagu's tasks was to offer British mediation to mitigate the brewing war between Turkey and Austria, which he attempted in Vienna, Austria, though he had little impact.

The Montagus travelled extensively in Europe before proceeding to Turkey. They visited Helvoetsluys, Rotterdam, Den Hague, Nijmegen, Cologne, Nuremberg, Ratisbon, Prague, Brunswick, and Hanover, in addition to their five-month stay in Vienna. They then travelled along the Danube to Constantinople, where Edward Montagu took up his post. He was recalled back to England after only two years, and the couple travelled through Italy and France on their return.

Contents
The Turkish Embassy Letters consist of fifty-eight letters addressed to friends and relatives from various places on their journey. Twenty-two letters describe their travels in Europe on the way to Turkey, twenty-seven were written from Turkey in Adrianople or Constantinople, and nine are from their return journey. Although the majority of the letters were written in Europe, Montagu's descriptions of Turkey garnered the most attention, especially her descriptions of women-only spaces such as baths.

Bibliography

Citations

References 
 
 

1716 documents
1717 documents
1718 documents
1763 books
Collections of letters
Travel books
Books about the Ottoman Empire
Books published posthumously